Vasile Ernu (born 1971) is a Soviet-born Romanian writer.

Born in Odessa, Soviet Union, Ernu studied philosophy at the Alexandru Ioan Cuza University in Iași, graduating in 1996, after which he earned a master's degree in philosophy at the Babeș-Bolyai University in Cluj-Napoca in 1997.

Ernu's debut book is Născut în URSS ("Born in the USSR"), a self-biographic work in which he recounts his experiences in the Soviet Union, in a mix of melancholia and irony.

The book earned him the debut prize of the Writers' Union of Romania and the one of the România Literară magazine and it was translated in several languages, including: Russian, Italian, Spanish, Bulgarian, Hungarian, Polish and Georgian.

Works
 Născut în URSS (Born in the USSR), Polirom, 2006
 Ultimii eretici ai Imperiului (The last heretics of the Empire), Polirom, 2009
 Intelighenția rusă azi (Russian intelligentsia today), Editura Cartier, 2012
 Sunt un om de stânga (I am a left-winger), Editura Cartier, 2013
 Sectanții. Mică trilogie a marginalilor (Cultists. A small trilogy of the marginalized), Polirom, 2015
 Intelighenția basarabeană azi. Interviuri, discuții, polemici despre Basarabia de ieri și de azi (Bessarabian intelligentsia  today. Interviews, discussions, debates on today's and yesterday's Bessarabia), Editura Cartier, 2016

References

External links
Vasile Ernu's website

Romanian writers
Romanian editors
Romanian activists
1971 births
Living people
Writers from Odesa
Babeș-Bolyai University alumni
Alexandru Ioan Cuza University alumni
Romanian essayists